Banyutus is a genus of antlions belonging to the family Myrmeleontidae.

The species of this genus are found in Southern Africa.

Species:

Banyutus acutus 
Banyutus elisabethanus 
Banyutus feai 
Banyutus hesione 
Banyutus horridus 
Banyutus idoneus 
Banyutus insidiosus 
Banyutus lethalis 
Banyutus lethifer 
Banyutus lituratus 
Banyutus lombardi 
Banyutus maynei 
Banyutus neuter 
Banyutus pulverulentus 
Banyutus quarrei 
Banyutus roseostigma 
Banyutus shimba

References

Myrmeleontidae
Myrmeleontidae genera